Jo Zach Miller Jr. (April 16, 1863 – February 16, 1951) was governor (president) of the Federal Reserve Bank of Kansas City from 1916 to 1922.

Miller was born on a farm near Austin, Texas. He attended Saint Louis University and returned to Texas, where he was a prominent banker.

In 1910 he moved to Kansas City where he became vice president of the Commerce Trust Company. In 1914 he was named the first chairman of the newly formed Federal Reserve Bank of Kansas City. In 1916 became he governor (president) of the bank, and he oversaw the construction of the bank's headquarters at 925 Grand.

After retiring, he was hospitalized at St. Mary's Hospital at 1 Memorial Drive on the site of what is today's Federal Reserve building.

References

1863 births
1951 deaths
Federal Reserve Bank of Kansas City presidents
People from Austin, Texas
Saint Louis University alumni